Magnetized is the third studio album by Johnny Hates Jazz released on May 24, 2013. This album was the band's first album in 22 years, after Tall Stories and the departure of members Calvin Hayes and Phil Thornalley, and the return of founding vocalist Clark Datchler. The album, was followed by the release of the same-titled lead single, along with a corresponding music video. The album peaked at #102 in the UK.

Critical reception

Upon release Magnetized received highly favorable reviews from critics. Radio Creme Brulee stated that the album might be 2013's "pop album of the year". Nick Pett of Backseat Mafia gave the album a more mixed review, but later said that the album "isn't all bad.."

Track listing 
All songs written by Datchler and produced by Nocito.

Personnel 
Johnny Hates Jazz
 Clark Datchler – vocals, keyboards, acoustic piano, synth bass (1-5, 7-10)
 Mike Nocito – programming 

Additional musicians
 Jamie Muhoberac – keyboards (1-4, 8)
 Pete Watson – keyboards (1, 4)
 Berenice Scott – keyboards (2, 5), backing vocals (3, 7)
 Anne Dudley – keyboards (3, 7, 10), string arrangements (3, 7, 10)
 Marcus Bonfanti – guitars (1, 4, 7)
 David Munday – guitars (1-5, 7, 10)
 Neil Taylor – guitars (5, 6)
 David Rhodes – guitars (8, 9)
 Alex Reeves – drums 
 Lily Gonzalez – percussion (1, 4, 7)
 Frank Ricotti – percussion 
 Vince de la Cruz – tambourine (1, 4, 7), bass guitar (6)
 Alex Cooper – chant (8)
 Phil Nichol – chant (8)
 Steve Stewart – chant (8)

Production 
 Mike Nocito – producer, engineer 
 Stephen M. Tayler – mixing 
 Tony Cousins – mastering 
 Rob O'Connor – art direction 
 Mark Higenbottam – design, illustration 
 Stylorouge – design, illustration 
 Simon Fowler – photography 
 Alyson Fennell – stylist 
 Karen Mason – hair, make-up 
 John Wooler – management

References

2013 albums
Johnny Hates Jazz albums